The Rillito River (Spanish "Little River") is a river in Pima County, Arizona. The Rillito River Park runs along the north and south banks of the river from Interstate 10 to North Craycroft Road.

History
Prior to colonization by European settlers, much of the Santa Cruz valley was filled with riparian habitats, including numerous zones along the banks of the Rillito River. As recently as the late 19th century, the river was a perennial stream lined with trees and dense vegetation such as cottonwoods, willows, and mesquites. However, due to increased pumping of groundwater for irrigation projects to support agriculture and urban development, the river eventually dried up and much of the riparian habitat was lost by the mid-20th century. The loss of vegetation led to increased erosion of the river banks during flood events, which in turn led to a widening and straightening of the river channel.

Today, the Rillito is an ephemeral river that carries water only during floods or in response to snowmelt. In the late 20th century, as a flood control measure, many segments of the channel's banks were stabilized using soil cement to reduce erosion and prevent the water from overflowing the banks and damaging property.

References

Rivers of Arizona
Rivers of Pima County, Arizona
Sonoran Desert
Santa Cruz River (Arizona)